Air Canada Express is a brand name of regional feeder flights for Air Canada that are subcontracted to other airlines. As of March 2021, Jazz Aviation is the sole operator of Air Canada Express. They primarily connect smaller cities with Air Canada's domestic hub airports and focus cities, although they offer some point-to-point and international service to the United States.

History
On April 26, 2011, it was reported that Air Canada decided to retire the Air Canada Jazz brand and created the Air Canada Express brand.   Prior to establishing the Express name, the flights operated primarily under the Air Canada Jazz or Air Canada Alliance banners.

As of January 2020, Air Georgian no longer provides services under the capacity purchase agreement. Those services were transferred back to Jazz Aviation. On March 1, 2021, it was also announced that Sky Regional would also no longer provide services under the capacity purchase agreement and therefore Jazz Aviation would become the sole operator of the express brand.

Destinations

Operators and fleet

Current fleet
As of March 2023, the fleet consists of the following aircraft:

Historical fleet
The Air Canada Express brand, through its various regional and commuter airline partners, operated a variety of turbofan and twin turboprop aircraft over the years including the following types:
 Bombardier CRJ100
 Beechcraft 1900D
 De Havilland Canada Dash 8-100
 De Havilland Canada Dash 8-300

See also
 List of Air Canada destinations

Notes

References

External links 
  Online list of Air Canada fleet

Air Canada
Regional airline brands
Airlines established in 2011
Canadian companies established in 2011
Star Alliance affiliate members
Canadian brands